There Be Squabbles Ahead is the first full-length album from Stolen Babies.

The album has received almost unanimously positive reviews, and has helped to expand their fanbase massively.

Track listing
All songs written by Dominique Lenore Persi and Rani Sharone, except where noted.
 "Spill!"  – 3:21
 "Awful Fall"  – 3:44
 "Filistata"  – 3:17
 "A Year of Judges"  – 3:20
 "So Close"  – 4:21
 "Tablescrap"  – 3:54
 "Swint? or Slude?" (Sharone) – 2:16
 "Mind Your Eyes"  – 4:04
 "Lifeless"  – 5:56
 "Tall Tales"  – 3:41
 "Push Button"  – 4:07
 "Gathering Fingers"  – 5:20
 "The Button Has Been Pushed"  – 1:45

Info
 Additional background vocals on tracks 3, 7 and 12 performed by Dan Rathbun
 Additional tuba on track 7 performed by Dan Rathbun
 Violin on tracks 7 and 11 performed by Carla Kihlstedt
 Trumpet on tracks 3, 7 and 12 performed by Michael Iago Mellender
 Acoustic guitar on track 11 performed by Davin Givhan
 Recorded and mixed by Dan Rathbun
 Album artwork by Dominique Lenore Persi and Crab Scrambly

Notes
According to bassist Rani Sharone in an interview with Music Street Journal, track number seven obtained its title from some creative wordplay:
"It all started with the word "Interlude," the song's original title. Interlude...Int er lude...Swint er Slude...Swint or Slude...Swint or Slude?...there ya go... the metamorphosis of the word interlude. Loosely inspired by a Jeopardy category."''

"Filistata" is the name for a genus of spiders native to Eurasia and Northern Africa.
"Push Button" was previously recorded and produced by John Avila.

References

External links
 Stolen Babies Discography Info

2006 albums
The End Records albums
Stolen Babies albums